International Convention on Oil Pollution Preparedness, Response and Co-operation (OPRC) is an international maritime convention establishing measures for dealing with marine oil pollution incidents nationally and in co-operation with other countries. , there are 112 state parties to the convention.

OPRC Convention was drafted within the framework of the International Maritime Organization and adopted in 1990 entering into force in 1995. In 2000 a protocol to the Convention relating to hazardous and noxious substances (HNS) was adopted (the OPRC-HNS Protocol).

In accordance with this convention and its annex, states-parties to the 1990 convention undertake, individually or jointly, to take all appropriate measures to prepare for and respond to oil pollution incidents.

Scope 

The Convention applies to:
 vessels of any type whatsoever operating in the marine environment including hydrofoil boats, air-cushion vehicles, submersibles, and floating craft of any type;
 fixed or floating offshore installations or structures engaged in gas or oil exploration, exploitation or production activities, or loading or unloading of oil; and
 sea ports and oil handling facilities (those facilities which present a risk of an oil pollution incident, including, sea ports, oil terminals, pipelines and other oil handling facilities).

The Convention does not apply to warships, naval auxiliary or other ships owned or operated by a state and used only on government non-commercial service. However, parties to the Convention ensure by the adoption of appropriate measures that such ships act in a manner consistent with the convention.

Oil pollution emergency plans 
Ships are required to carry a shipboard oil pollution emergency plan, in accordance with the provisions adopted by the International Maritime Organization (IMO) for this purpose. These plans are subject, while in a port or at an offshore terminal under the jurisdiction of a party, to inspection by officers duly authorized by that party.

Operators of offshore units under the jurisdiction of the parties are required to have oil pollution emergency plans, which are co-ordinated with the national system for responding to oil pollution incidents, approved in accordance with procedures established by the competent national authority.

Authorities or operators in charge of sea ports and oil handling facilities under the jurisdiction of parties are also required to have oil pollution emergency plans or similar arrangements which are co-ordinated with the national oil pollution response system).

Oil pollution reporting procedures 
In accordance with the Convention masters or other persons having charge of ships flying the flag of a party and persons having charge of offshore units under the jurisdiction of a party are required to report without delay any event on their ship or offshore unit involving a discharge or probable discharge of oil:
 
(i) in the case of a ship, to the nearest coastal state;

(ii) in the case of an offshore unit, to the coastal state to whose jurisdiction the unit is subject.
 
Masters or other persons having charge of ships flying the flag of a party and persons having charge of offshore units under the jurisdiction of a party are also required to report without delay in a similar way any observed event at sea involving a discharge of oil or the presence of oil.

Persons having charge of sea ports and oil handling facilities under the jurisdiction of a party are required to report without delay any event involving a discharge or probable discharge of oil or the presence of oil to the competent national authority.

Parties to the convention are required to instruct its maritime inspection vessels or aircraft and other appropriate services or officials to report without delay any observed event at sea or at a sea port or oil handling facility involving a discharge of oil or the presence of oil to the competent national authority or to the nearest coastal state; and
request the pilots of civil aircraft to report without delay any observed event at sea involving a discharge of oil or the presence of oil to the nearest coastal state).

National and regional systems for preparedness and response 
Each party is under obligation to establish a national system for responding promptly and effectively to oil pollution incidents. Such system comprises:
 designated competent national authority or authorities with responsibility for oil pollution preparedness and response;
 national operational contact point or points, responsible for the receipt and transmission of oil pollution reports; and
 authority which is entitled to act on behalf of the state to request assistance or to decide to render the assistance requested.

Also, the system includes a national contingency plan for preparedness and response outlining the organizational relationship of the various involved bodies, public or private, taking into account guidelines developed by the IMO.

In addition, each party, either individually or through bilateral or multilateral co-operation and in co-operation with the oil and shipping industries, port authorities and other relevant entities, has to establish: 
 a minimum level of pre-positioned oil spill combating equipment and programmes for its use;
 a programme of exercises for oil pollution response organizations and training of relevant personnel;
 detailed plans and communication capabilities for responding to an oil pollution incident; and
 a mechanism or arrangement to co-ordinate the response to an oil pollution incident with the capabilities to mobilize the necessary resources). Parties ensure that all relevant information is provided to the IMO.

International co-operation in pollution response 
Parties are required to co-operate and provide advisory services, technical support and equipment for the purpose of responding to an oil pollution incident upon the request of any party affected or likely to be affected by such incident. The financing of the costs for such assistance is based on the provisions set out in the annex to the convention.

Salient features of OPRC 
 It aims at providing a global framework for international cooperation in combating major incidents or threats of marine pollution.
 Parties to the convention are required to establish measures in dealing with pollution incidents, either nationally or with other countries.
 Ships are required to carry a shipboard oil emergency plans.
 Operators of offshore units are also required to have oil pollution emergency plans or similar arrangements, which must be coordinated with national systems for responding promptly and effectively to oil pollution incidents.
 Ships are required to report incidents to coastal authorities and the convention details the actions that are to be taken.
 The convention calls for the stockpiles of oil spill combating equipment, oil spill combating exercises and development of detailed plans for dealing with pollution incidents.
 Parties to the convention are required to provide assistance to others in the event of a pollution emergency and provision is made for the reimbursement of any assistance provided.
 A protocol to OPRC relating to hazardous and noxious substances (the OPRC-HNS Protocol) was adopted in 2000.

References

Further reading 
 Gold, Edgar. International Convention on Oil Pollution Preparedness, Response and Co-operation, 1990 – Report. 22 J. Mar. L. & Com. 341 (1991)
 Moller, T. H. Santner, R. S. Oil spill preparedness and response–the role of industry. ITOPF. 1997 International Oil Spill Conference.
 Nelson, P. Australia's National Plan to combat pollution of the sea by oil and other noxious and hazardous substances-Overview and current issues. Spill Science & Technology Bulletin, 2000

Environmental treaties
International Convention on Oil Pollution Preparedness, Response and Co-operation
International Convention on Oil Pollution Preparedness, Response and Co-operation
Law of the sea treaties
International Convention on Oil Pollution Preparedness, Response and Co-operation
Treaties concluded in 1990
Treaties entered into force in 1995
Treaties of Albania
Treaties of Algeria
Treaties of Angola
Treaties of Antigua and Barbuda
Treaties of Argentina
Treaties of Australia
Treaties of Azerbaijan
Treaties of the Bahamas
Treaties of Bahrain
Treaties of Bangladesh
Treaties of Benin
Treaties of Brazil
Treaties of Bulgaria
Treaties of Cameroon
Treaties of Canada
Treaties of Cape Verde
Treaties of Chile
Treaties of the People's Republic of China
Treaties of Colombia
Treaties of the Comoros
Treaties of the Republic of the Congo
Treaties of Ivory Coast
Treaties of Croatia
Treaties of Cuba
Treaties of Denmark
Treaties of Djibouti
Treaties of Dominica
Treaties of Ecuador
Treaties of Egypt
Treaties of El Salvador
Treaties of Estonia
Treaties of Finland
Treaties of France
Treaties of Gabon
Treaties of Georgia (country)
Treaties of Germany
Treaties of Ghana
Treaties of Greece
Treaties of Guinea
Treaties of Guyana
Treaties of Honduras
Treaties of Iceland
Treaties of India
Treaties of Iran
Treaties of Ireland
Treaties of Israel
Treaties of Italy
Treaties of Jamaica
Treaties of Japan
Treaties of Jordan
Treaties of Kenya
Treaties of Latvia
Treaties of Lebanon
Treaties of Liberia
Treaties of the Libyan Arab Jamahiriya
Treaties of Lithuania
Treaties of Madagascar
Treaties of Malaysia
Treaties of Malta
Treaties of the Marshall Islands
Treaties of Mauritania
Treaties of Mauritius
Treaties of Mexico
Treaties of Monaco
Treaties of Morocco
Treaties of Mozambique
Treaties of Myanmar
Treaties of Namibia
Treaties of the Netherlands
Treaties of New Zealand
Treaties of Nigeria
Treaties of Norway
Treaties of Oman
Treaties of Pakistan
Treaties of Palau
Treaties of Peru
Treaties of the Philippines
Treaties of Poland
Treaties of Portugal
Treaties of Qatar
Treaties of South Korea
Treaties of Romania
Treaties of Russia
Treaties of Saint Kitts and Nevis
Treaties of Saint Lucia
Treaties of Samoa
Treaties of Saudi Arabia
Treaties of Senegal
Treaties of Seychelles
Treaties of Sierra Leone
Treaties of Singapore
Treaties of Slovenia
Treaties of South Africa
Treaties of Spain
Treaties of Sudan
Treaties of Sweden
Treaties of Switzerland
Treaties of Syria
Treaties of Thailand
Treaties of Togo
Treaties of Tonga
Treaties of Trinidad and Tobago
Treaties of Tunisia
Treaties of Turkey
Treaties of the United Kingdom
Treaties of Tanzania
Treaties of the United States
Treaties of Uruguay
Treaties of Vanuatu
Treaties of Venezuela
Treaties of Yemen
1990 in London
1995 in the environment
Treaties extended to the Isle of Man
Treaties extended to Aruba
Treaties extended to the Netherlands Antilles
Treaties extended to Greenland
Treaties extended to Hong Kong
Treaties extended to Macau